Mate Pavić and Michael Venus won the title, defeating Rameez Junaid and Adil Shamasdin in the final, 6–1, 6–4.

Seeds

Draw

References
 Main Draw

Electra Israel Open - Doubles
Israel Open